Allium cyathophorum is a Chinese (杯花韭, bei hua jiu) species of flowering plant in the onion genus Allium of the family Amaryllidaceae. It grows at elevations from 2700 metres up to 4600 metres.

Description
This bulbous herbaceous perennial has thick roots but thin, fibrous bulbs. The leaves are flat, narrowly linear, usually shorter than the scapes. The umbels are hemispheric (half spheres) with purple flowers.

Taxonomy
Allium cyathophorum is found in the third evolutionary line of the genus Allium. It is a member of the subgenus Cyathophora and is the type species for that subgenus.

Varieties
Two infraspecific varieties are recognized:
 Allium cyathophorum var. cyathophorum (Syn. Allium venustum C.H.Wright) --- tepals blunt-tipped - Qinghai, Sichuan, Tibet, Yunnan
 Allium cyathophorum var. farreri (Stearn) Stearn (Syn. Allium farreri Stearn) --  tepals pointed at the tips - Gansu, Sichuan

William Stearn originally named Allium farreri in 1930 after Reginald Farrer, but in 1950 realised it was a variety of Allium cyathophorum, and so renamed it.

References

Bibliography

 
 
 

cyathophorum
Onions
Flora of China
Plants described in 1891